Final league standings for the 1923-24 St. Louis Soccer League.

League standings

External links
St. Louis Soccer Leagues (RSSSF)
The Year in American Soccer - 1924

1923-24
1923–24 domestic association football leagues
1923–24 in American soccer
St Louis Soccer
St Louis Soccer